Holiday v Sigil (1826) 2 C&P 176 is a case at common law concerning the recovery of a banknote.

Facts
The defendant had a £500 note that had been dropped by the claimant. The claimant brought an action for money had and received. The trial was by jury.

Judgment
Abbott CJ gave the following directions to the jury.

See also

English trusts law

Notes

English trusts case law
Court of Chancery cases
1826 in British law
1826 in case law